The Nantucket Cliff Lights, also known as the Nantucket Cliff Range Lights were a set of range lights on Nantucket. Over the years, there were several sets of range lights to lead ships into Nantucket Harbor. The first were built in 1838.  The second, a pair of conical white towers which still exist-owned by the Gilbreth family of "Cheaper by the Dozen" Fame-although not on the same site, were discontinued in 1912. The Gilbreth Family purchased the two latter range lights in 1921.

See also
Nantucket Harbor Range Lights
Nantucket Beacon
Brant Point Light

References

External links
 Lighthouse Friends page on Nantucket Cliff Range

Lighthouses completed in 1838
Lighthouses in Nantucket, Massachusetts